European viper may refer to:

 Vipera berus, the common European adder, a venomous snake widespread in Europe and Asia
 Vipera aspis, the European asp, a venomous snake found in southwestern Europe

Animal common name disambiguation pages